Pine Grove is a census-designated place in Amador County, California. It lies at an elevation of 2513 feet (766 m). The population was 2,219 at the 2010 census. The community is in ZIP code 95665 and area code 209.

The current boundaries of Pine Grove include the former mining towns of Clinton and Irishtown. The town also is home to Indian Grinding Rock State Historic Park.

A post office opened in Pine Grove in 1856.

Demographics
The 2010 United States Census reported that Pine Grove had a population of 2,219. The racial makeup of Pine Grove was 2,027 (91.3%) White, 9 (0.4%) African American, 36 (1.6%) Native American, 9 (0.4%) Asian, 6 (0.3%) Pacific Islander, 49 (2.2%) from other races, and 83 (3.7%) from two or more races. Hispanic or Latino of any race were 202 persons (9.1%).

The Census reported that 2,215 people (99.8% of the population) lived in households, 4 (0.2%) lived in non-institutionalized group quarters, and 0 (0%) were institutionalized.

There were 984 households, out of which 215 (21.8%) had children under the age of 18 living in them, 531 (54.0%) were opposite-sex married couples living together, 86 (8.7%) had a female householder with no husband present, 50 (5.1%) had a male householder with no wife present.  There were 62 (6.3%) unmarried opposite-sex partnerships, and 2 (0.2%) same-sex married couples or partnerships. 272 households (27.6%) were made up of individuals, and 140 (14.2%) had someone living alone who was 65 years of age or older. The average household size was 2.25.  There were 667 families (67.8% of all households); the average family size was 2.68.

The population was spread out, with 363 people (16.4%) under the age of 18, 149 people (6.7%) aged 18 to 24, 332 people (15.0%) aged 25 to 44, 825 people (37.2%) aged 45 to 64, and 550 people (24.8%) who were 65 years of age or older.  The median age was 52.7 years. For every 100 females, there were 99.2 males.  For every 100 females age 18 and over, there were 97.7 males.

The homeowner vacancy rate was 3.5%; the rental vacancy rate was 5.4%.  1,668 people (75.2% of the population) lived in owner-occupied housing units and 547 people (24.7%) lived in rental housing units.

Politics

References

External links 
Pine Grove web site

Census-designated places in Amador County, California
Census-designated places in California